Charles E. Street (April 6, 1873 – October 13, 1950) was an American football player and coach and physician. He served as the head football coach at Monmouth College in Monmouth, Illinois in 1902 and at Springfield College (then known as the Springfield YMCA Training School) from 1904 to 1906. He played college football at the University of Michigan, where he was the starting quarterback for three games in 1898 and for six games in 1899.

Street was born on April 6, 1873 in Lee, Massachusetts and graduated there from Lee High School. He graduated from Williams College in 1896 and the University of Michigan Medical School. He practiced medicine for 47 years in Springfield, Massachusetts. Street died on October 13, 1950, at Pittsfield General Hospital in Pittsfield, Massachusetts.

Head coaching record

References

1873 births
1950 deaths
20th-century American physicians
American physicians
American football quarterbacks
Michigan Wolverines football players
Monmouth Fighting Scots football coaches
Springfield Pride football coaches
Williams Ephs football players
University of Michigan Medical School alumni
People from Lee, Massachusetts
Players of American football from Massachusetts
Coaches of American football from Massachusetts
Physicians from Massachusetts
Sportspeople from Berkshire County, Massachusetts